Ishockeyklubben Sparta Sarpsborg, commonly referred to as the Sparta Warriors, is a Norwegian ice hockey team based in Sarpsborg, Norway. They currently play in the Fjordkraft League. They play their home games in the Sparta Amfi arena and is Norway's oldest ice hockey rink. The team colours are blue and white.

History
The ice hockey department of IL Sparta was founded in 1958, and got off to a fantastic start when Norway's first indoor hockey arena, Sparta Amfi, was opened in 1963. Within three years, they earned promotion to the Eliteserien (first division) as the first team outside Oslo to do so. It was only to be a short stint, and through most part of the late 1960s and 1970s, Sparta spent their time in the second division, with occasional visits to the top flight.

The 1980s was to be Sparta's greatest decade. Under the leadership of coach Lasse Bäckman and strengthened by several strong signings from other Norwegian clubs and a couple of Swedish stars, they claimed the Norwegian Championships in 1984. The feat was repeated in 1989, when the club beat heavily favoured Trondheim in the final after claiming the last playoff spot.

Economic problems followed this success, and in 1995 Sparta filed for bankruptcy, the only sports club in Norway ever to do so. This meant that they had to start from scratch in the third division, and they lost their best players to other clubs in Norway.  However, many of these players subsequently returned to Sparta, and in 1997 they were back in the Eliteserien, where they have remained since.

In the 2008-09 season, the team won the league, and won silver in the Norwegian Championship after being defeated by Vålerenga in the final.

Season-by-season results
This is a partial list of the last five seasons completed by the Sparta Warriors. For the full season-by-season history, see List of Sparta Warriors seasons.

Records and statistics 

Scoring leader statistics for regular season only. Matches played statistic includes playoff games.
  – current active player

Scoring leaders

Most league matches 

Last updated: 29 May 2018Source: http://stats.sparta.no/

Famous players
 Per-Åge Skrøder
 Matthew Yeats
 Jonas Holøs
 Martin Røymark
 Per Christian Knold

References

External links
Official website
Official website for the supporter club, Blue Warriors

 
Ice hockey teams in Norway
GET-ligaen teams
Sport in Sarpsborg
1958 establishments in Norway
Ice hockey clubs established in 1958